The Kandy War Cemetery, formerly known as the Pitakande Military Cemetery, is a British military cemetery in Kandy, Sri Lanka, for soldiers of the British Empire who were killed during World War II as well as a soldier who died during World War I.

There are 203 buried consisting of: 107 British, 35 East Africans, 26 Sri Lankans, 23  Indians, 6 Canadians, 3 Italians, 1 Frenchman and 2 unidentified persons, Of the 203 dead, 151 were army, 32 were air force, 16 were navy, 2 were unidentified, 1 was merchant navy and 1 was from the national fire service.

Location 

See also 
 British Garrison Cemetery
 Liveramentu Cemetery
 Trincomalee British War Cemetery

References

External links 

 Commonwealth War Cemetery Kandy
 Kandy Graveyards

Cemeteries in Sri Lanka
Commonwealth War Graves Commission cemeteries in Sri Lanka
Buildings and structures in Kandy
Tourist attractions in Central Province, Sri Lanka